Elias Storm (born 19 July 1979) is a Swedish former professional footballer who played as a centre-back. Storm was part of the Djurgården Swedish champions' team of 2002, 2003, and 2005.

Honours
Djurgårdens IF
 Allsvenskan (3): 2002, 2003, 2005

References

Living people
1979 births
Association football central defenders
Swedish footballers
Allsvenskan players
Djurgårdens IF Fotboll players
Footballers from Stockholm